Duplorbidae is a family of barnacles belonging to the infraclass Rhizocephala.

Genera:
 Arcturosaccus Rybakov & Høeg, 1992
 Cryptogaster Bocquet-Védrine & Bourdon, 1984
 Duplorbis Smith, 1906

References

Barnacles
Crustacean families